The following is a list of events affecting American television in 2009. Events listed include television show debuts, finales, cancellations, and new channel launches.

Notable events

January

February

March

April

May

June

July

August

September

October

November

December

Programs

Debuts

Entering syndication this year

Changes of network affiliation

Returning this year

Milestone episodes

Ending this year

Made-for-TV movies and miniseries

Networks and services

Network launches

Network closures

Television stations

Station launches

Network affiliation changes

Station closures

Births

Deaths

January

February

March

April

May

June

July

August

September

October

November

December

See also
 2009 in the United States
 List of American films of 2009

References

External links
 List of 2009 American television series at IMDb

 
2000s in American television